This is a partial list of works that use metafictional ideas. Metafiction is intentional allusion or reference to a work's fictional nature. It is commonly used for humorous or parodic effect, and has appeared in a wide range of mediums, including writing, film, theatre, and video gaming.

Novels, novellas and short stories

Pre-20th century works
 Ludovico Ariosto, Orlando Furioso
 Jane Austen, Northanger Abbey
Jane Austen, Mansfield Park
Thomas Carlyle, Sartor Resartus
 Miguel de Cervantes, Don Quixote
 Margaret Cavendish, The Blazing World
 Geoffrey Chaucer, The Canterbury Tales
 Denis Diderot, Jacques the Fatalist
 Henry Fielding, The History of Tom Jones, a Foundling
 James Hogg, The Private Memoirs and Confessions of a Justified Sinner
 Laurence Sterne, The Life and Opinions of Tristram Shandy, Gentleman
 William Makepeace Thackeray, Vanity Fair
 Machado de Assis, The Posthumous Memoirs of Brás Cubas
The Plum in the Golden Vase
Cao Xueqin, Dream of the Red Chamber
Zhuangzi
Ki no Tsurayuki, Tosa Nikki
Unknown, Sarashina Nikki
 H. G. Wells, The War of the Worlds

Modern and contemporary works
 Peter Ackroyd, English Music
 Richard Adams, The Plague Dogs
 Rabih Alameddine, I, the Divine
 Felipe Alfau, Locos: A Comedy of Gestures
 Martin Amis, Money, London Fields, Time's Arrow, The Information
 Isaac Asimov, Murder at the ABA
 Margaret Atwood, The Handmaid's Tale, The Testaments
 Paul Auster, The New York Trilogy: City of Glass (1985), Ghosts (1986) and The Locked Room (1986)
 Nicholson Baker, The Mezzanine
 John Barnes, One for the Morning Glory
 Julian Barnes, Flaubert's Parrot
 John Barth, Chimera; Coming Soon!!!; The Floating Opera; The Sot-Weed Factor; Lost in the Funhouse
 Peter S. Beagle, The Last Unicorn
 Samuel Beckett, Watt
 Thomas Bernhard, Wittgenstein's Nephew
 Roberto Bolaño, The Savage Detectives, 2666
 Jorge Luis Borges, "The Garden of Forking Paths"; "Tlön, Uqbar, Orbis Tertius"; "Pierre Menard, Author of the Quixote"
 George Bowering, Burning Water
Steven Brust and collaborators, Five Hundred Years After
 William S. Burroughs, Naked Lunch
 Michel Butor, Second Thoughts
 A. S. Byatt, Possession: A Romance
 James Branch Cabell, The Cream of the Jest
 Guillermo Cabrera Infante, Tres tristes tigres
 Italo Calvino, If on a winter's night a traveler
 Peter Carey, Illywhacker
 Jonathan Carroll, The Land of Laughs
 J. M. Coetzee, Slow Man
 Douglas Cooper, Amnesia, Delirium
 Julio Cortázar, Hopscotch
 Douglas Coupland, jPod
 John Crowley, Little, Big, Novelty, Lord Byron's Novel: The Evening Land, The Solitudes 
 Mark Z. Danielewski, House of Leaves
 Peter David, Young Justice, Sir Apropos of Nothing
 Samuel R. Delany, The Einstein Intersection; Dhalgren
 Philip K. Dick, VALIS; The Man in the High Castle
 Joan Didion, Democracy
 Umberto Eco, Foucault's Pendulum; The Island of the Day Before; The Name of the Rose 
 Jennifer Egan, The Keep
 Dave Eggers, A Heartbreaking Work of Staggering Genius
 Bret Easton Ellis, Lunar Park
 Harlan Ellison, "The Deathbird"
 Michael Ende, The Neverending Story
 Steve Erickson, Arc d'X; The Sea Came in at Midnight
 Steven Erikson, Dust of Dreams; Crack'd Pot Trail
 Raymond Federman, Twofold Vibration; Smiles on Washington Square; Take It Or Leave It
 Jasper Fforde, The Eyre Affair; Lost in a Good Book; The Well of Lost Plots; Something Rotten; The Big Over Easy; The Fourth Bear
 Jonathan Safran Foer, Everything Is Illuminated
 Ford Madox Ford, The Good Soldier
 John Fowles, The French Lieutenant's Woman
 Jostein Gaarder, Sophie's World
 Gabriel García Márquez, One Hundred Years of Solitude
 John Gardner, October Light; Grendel
 William H. Gass, The Tunnel
 André Gide, The Counterfeiters
 William Goldman, The Princess Bride
 Alasdair Gray, Lanark
 Robert Grudin, Book: A Novel
 Mark Haddon, The Curious Incident of the Dog in the Nighttime
 Steven Hall; The Raw Shark Texts
 Larry Heinemann, Paco's Story
 Robert A. Heinlein, The Number of the Beast; Glory Road
 Douglas Hofstadter, dialogues in Gödel, Escher, Bach
 Marek Huberath, Nest of Worlds (Gniazdo światów)
 Rhys Hughes, Nowhere Near Milk Wood; The Postmodern Mariner; The Less Lonely Planet
 B. S. Johnson, Christie Malry's Own Double-Entry
 James Joyce, Ulysses; Finnegans Wake
 Stephen King, The Dark Tower; Misery; The Dark Half; Bag of Bones
 Michael Muhammad Knight, Osama Van Halen
 Milan Kundera, The Book of Laughter and Forgetting; The Unbearable Lightness of Being
 Stanisław Lem, A Perfect Vacuum; Imaginary Magnitude; Provocation, One Human Minute
 Doris Lessing, The Golden Notebook
 Joan Lindsay, Through Darkest Pondelayo
 Penelope Lively, Moon Tiger
 David Lodge, Therapy; Nice Work
 Ki Longfellow, Houdini Heart
 Dimitris Lyacos, With the People from the Bridge
 Steve Lyons, Doctor Who'''; Virgin New Adventures:Conundrum Barry N. Malzberg, Galaxies; Herovit's World Yann Martel, Life of Pi Ian McEwan, Atonement Shaun Micallef, Smithereens (book); Preincarnate (book); The President's Desk David Mitchell, Cloud Atlas Spike Milligan, Puckoon Walter Moers, The 13½ Lives of Captain Bluebear; Ensel und Kretel; The City of Dreaming Books Michael Moorcock, The Second Ether sequence (Blood, Fabulous Harbours, and The War Amongst The Angels)
 Ethan Mordden, The Buddies Cycle
 Toni Morrison, Jazz John Muckle, London Brakes Haruki Murakami, Kafka on the Shore Vladimir Nabokov, The Gift; Pale Fire; Look at the Harlequins!; Lolita Flann O'Brien, At Swim-Two-Birds Tim O'Brien, The Things They Carried Michael Ondaatje, Running in the Family Juan Carlos Onetti, El Pozo Chuck Palahniuk, Fight Club; Diary; Haunted Grace Paley, A Conversation with my Father Kenneth Patchen, The Journal of Albion Moonlight Milorad Pavić's novels
 Nisio Isin, Monogatari Series; Zaregoto Series; Shin Honkaku Mahou Shoujo Risuka; etc
 John Pearson, James Bond: The Authorized Biography of 007 Arturo Pérez-Reverte, The Club Dumas Salvador Plascencia, The People of Paper Terry Pratchett, several of the Discworld; The Amazing Maurice and His Educated Rodents Robert Rankin's novels
 Alain Robbe-Grillet, La Jalousie; La maison de rendez-vous Philip Roth, Operation Shylock Salman Rushdie, Haroun and the Sea of Stories; Midnight's Children; Shalimar the Clown Douglas Rushkoff, Exit Strategy José Saramago, Blindness; The Cave; The Double Howard Schoenfeld, Built Up Logically Idries Shah, The Book of the Book Robert Sheckley, Options Dan Sleigh, Islands José Carlos Somoza, The Athenian Murders Gilbert Sorrentino, Mulligan Stew Muriel Spark, The Comforters Peter Straub, In the Night Room Jonathan Stroud, The Bartimaeus Trilogy José Baroja, The curious case of the shadow that died as a memory Janet Tashjian, The Gospel According to Larry; Vote for Larry J. R. R. Tolkien, "Leaf by Niggle"
 Roderick Townley, The Great Good Thing Miguel de Unamuno, Niebla Aritha Van Herk, Restlessness Jeff VanderMeer, City of Saints and Madmen Gore Vidal, Myra Breckinridge Kurt Vonnegut, Breakfast of Champions; Slaughterhouse-Five; Timequake David Foster Wallace, Brief Interviews with Hideous Men H. G. Wells, Tono-Bungay Colin Wilson, The Personality Surgeon Robert Anton Wilson and Robert Shea, The Illuminatus! Trilogy Jeanette Winterson, Sexing the Cherry' The Powerbook; Gut Symmetries Gene Wolfe, The Fifth Head of Cerberus, "The Last Thrilling Wonder Story"
 Virginia Woolf, Orlando: A Biography Ronald Wright, A Scientific RomanceUrsula K. Le Guin, Lavinia

Children's books and young adult fiction
 Crockett Johnson, Harold and the Purple Crayon John Dougherty, the Stinkbomb & Ketchup-Face series
 Michael Ende, The Neverending Story Cornelia Funke, Inkheart series
 Mordicai Gerstein, A Book Anders Jacobsson and Sören Olsson - Kobåj-Kurt (within the Bert Diaries)
 Diana Wynne Jones, Fire and Hemlock Arthur Ransome, Peter Duck, Missee Lee Lemony Snicket (Daniel Handler), A Series of Unfortunate Events (13 book series)
 Mo Willems, We Are in a Book! (Elephant and Piggie series)
 Jon Stone, The Monster at the End of This Book: Starring Lovable, Furry Old GroverEmily Gravett, Wolves, Little Mouse's Big Book of Fears
 Chris Wooding, PoisonAnimated short films
 Chuck Jones, Duck Amuck (1953) and Rabbit Rampage (1955).

Stage plays

Pre-20th century plays
 Francis Beaumont, The Knight of the Burning Pestle Thomas Kyd, The Spanish Tragedy William Shakespeare, Hamlet; A Midsummer Night's Dream; Pericles, Prince of Tyre Manuel Tamayo y Baus, Un drama nuevoModern theater works
 Samuel Beckett, Waiting for Godot; Endgame Noel Fielding and Julian Barratt, The Mighty Boosh (1998 stage show) Federico García Lorca, Play Without a Title / Untitled Play (1935)
 Joseph Heller, We Bombed in New Haven Arthur L. Kopit, End of the World with Symposium to Follow Ira Levin, Deathtrap Daniel MacIvor, Never Swim Alone and This Is a Play Steve Martin, Picasso at the Lapin Agile Luigi Pirandello, Six Characters in Search of an Author Tom Stoppard, Rosencrantz & Guildenstern Are Dead Peter Weiss, Marat/Sade (The Persecution and Assassination of Jean-Paul Marat As Performed by the Inmates of the Asylum of Charenton Under the Direction of the Marquis de Sade) Thornton Wilder, The Skin of Our Teeth Doug Wright, I Am My Own WifeMusicalsPassing StrangePippinFilms
 Keith Allen and Peter Richardson's Comic Strip film Detectives on the Edge of a Nervous Breakdown Woody Allen's The Purple Rose of Cairo, Deconstructing Harry and Midnight in Paris Robert Altman's The Player Troy Duffy's Boondock Saints Michael Bacall and Jonah Hill's 22 Jump Street Steve Bendelack's The League of Gentlemen's Apocalypse Ingmar Bergman's Persona, The Magician, Prison, and The Passion of Anna Colin Trevorrow's Jurassic World Mel Brooks's Blazing Saddles and Spaceballs John Carpenter's In the Mouth of Madness Wes Craven's Scream and Wes Craven's New Nightmare Wyllis Cooper's Quiet, Please scripts
 Francis Ford Coppola's Twixt David Cronenberg's Videodrome, Naked Lunch, and eXistenZ Tom DiCillo's Living in Oblivion Federico Fellini's 8½ David Fincher's Fight Club Marc Forster's Stranger Than Fiction Bob Fosse's All That Jazz
 Jason Friedberg and Aaron Seltzer's Epic Movie Jean-Luc Godard's Breathless Peter Greenaway's The Baby of Mâcon Kirt Gunn's Lovely By Surprise Michael Haneke's Funny Games Jim Henson's Muppets franchise (The Muppet Movie, The Great Muppet Caper, The Muppets Take Manhattan, The Muppet Christmas Carol, Muppet Treasure Island, Muppets from Space, The Muppets, and Muppets Most Wanted)
 Spike Jonze and Charlie Kaufman's Adaptation Charlie Kaufman's Synecdoche, New York and Anomalisa Buster Keaton's Sherlock Jr. David Lynch's Inland Empire John McTiernan's Last Action Hero Coleman Miller's Uso Justo John Cameron Mitchell's Hedwig and the Angry Inch
 Mike Myers and Michael McCullers's Austin Powers Andrew Niccol's The Truman Show Tim Miller's Deadpool and David Leitch's Deadpool 2 Christopher Nolan's Inception Trey Parker's South Park: Bigger, Longer & Uncut Roman Polanski's What? Robert Pulcini and Shari Springer Berman's American Splendor Kevin Smith's Jay and Silent Bob Strike Back Tom Tykwer's Run Lola Run Lana Wachowski's The Matrix Resurrections David Wain and Michael Showalter's They Came Together Shawn Wayans, Marlon Wayans, Buddy Johnson, Phil Beauman, Jason Friedberg, Aaron Seltzer, and Wes Craven's Scary Movie Quentin Dupieux's Rubber Joss Whedon and Drew Goddard's The Cabin in the Woods James Franco's Interior. Leather Bar. Michael Winterbottom's A Cock and Bull Story, a film adaptation of Laurence Sterne's Tristram Shandy Edgar Wright and Simon Pegg's Hot Fuzz Jaco Van Dormael's Mr. Nobody Lars von Trier's Epidemic Gaspar Noe's Lux Aeterna Saw Teong Hin's You Mean the World to Me Neill Blomkamp's District 9 Peter Ramsey, Rodney Rothman, and Bob Persichetti's Spider-Man: Into the Spider-Verse Ferris Bueller's Day Off Alejandro Jodorowsky's The Holy Mountain Shawn Levy's Free GuyTelevision shows
 30 Rock The Amazing World of Gumball American Dad! Animaniacs Arrested Development The Basil Brush Show Batman: The Brave and the Bold The Big O Black Mirror Boston Legal Buffy the Vampire Slayer Central Park Chowder The Cleveland Show Community Crazy Ex-Girlfriend Doctor Who Drawn Together Ed, Edd n Eddy Entourage Family Guy Fleabag The Fresh Prince of Bel-Air Girl Meets World Girls5eva 
 The Grim Adventures of Billy & Mandy High Fidelity
 Hi Hi Puffy AmiYumi How I Met Your Father How I Met Your Mother It's Garry Shandling's Show Lady Dynamite 'Looney Tunes
 Loki
 The Mighty Boosh
 Moonlighting
 Monty Python's Flying Circus
 The Muppet Show
 The Muppets
 Murder, She Wrote
 Ned's Declassified School Survival Guide
 Neon Genesis Evangelion
 Noel Fielding's Luxury Comedy
 The Office (U.S.)
 OK K.O.! Let's Be Heroes
 Phineas and Ferb
 The Powerpuff Girls
 Princess Tutu
 Re:Creators
 Red Dwarf: Back to Earth
 Rick and Morty
 Robot Chicken
 Scrubs
 Sean's Show
 The Simpsons
 South Park
 Supernatural
 Teletubbies
 Tooning Out the News
 Ultimate Spider-Man
 Velma
 WandaVision

Comic strips, comic books, graphic novels, and manga
 Aka Akasaka, Kaguya-sama: Love Is War
 Berke Breathed, Bloom County
 Rich Burlew, The Order of the Stick
 John Byrne's run on The Sensational She-Hulk and Dan Slott's run on She-Hulk
 Mike Carey, The Unwritten, featuring characters coming from, and journeying into, fictional worlds
 Paul Cornell, IDW 2013 Doctor Who Special: The Girl Who Loved Doctor Who
 Jim Davis, Garfield
 Andrew Hussie, Homestuck
 Nisio Isin and Akira Akatsuki, Medaka Box
 Tatsuya Ishida, Sinfest
 Jeff Lemire and Dean Ormston, Black Hammer
 Alan Moore, Promethea, Supreme and The League of Extraordinary Gentlemen
 Alan Moore and Dave Gibbons, Watchmen
 Grant Morrison, Animal Man, Doom Patrol, Flex Mentallo, The Filth, Batman R.I.P., Final Crisis and The Invisibles
 Atsushi Ōkubo, Fire Force
 Stephan Pastis, Pearls Before Swine
 Ryukishi07, Higurashi When They Cry and Umineko When They Cry
 Claudio Sanchez, Good Apollo, I'm Burning Star IV, Vol. 1, first half of the fourth chapter of The Amory Wars presents a metafictional aspect to the story
 Dave Sim, chapters "Minds" and "Guys" from his graphic novel Cerebus
 Dan Slott, Spider-Verse
 Kristofer Straub, Checkerboard Nightmare
 Adam Warren, Empowered
 Mason Williams, 1/0

Interactive media and video games 
 Against Gravity, Rec Room
 Blooming Buds Studio, Calendula
 Toby Fox, Undertale; Deltarune
 Shigesato Itoi, EarthBound; Mother 3
 Daniel Mullins, Pony Island, The Hex, Inscryption
 Mystman12, Baldi's Basics Classic Remastered
 Hideo Kojima, Metal Gear Solid
 Silicon Knights, Eternal Darkness
 Little Cat Feet, OneShot
 Josh Millard, Ennuigi
 Question, The Magic Circle
 Ryukishi07, Higurashi When They Cry and Umineko When They Cry
 Team Salvato, Doki Doki Literature Club!
 THQ, Saints Row: The Third, Saints Row 4
 Keiichiro Toyama, Silent Hill
 Davey Wreden, The Stanley Parable; The Beginner's Guide
 Ivan "Mad" Zanotti, IMSCARED
 SCA-JI, Wonderful Everyday
 Goichi Suda, Flower, Sun, and Rain; No More Heroes
 Ice-Pick Lodge, Pathologic
 Kazutaka Kodaka, Spike Chunsoft, Danganronpa 2: Goodbye Despair, Danganronpa V3: Killing Harmony
 Ubisoft Montreal, Assassin's Creed IV: Black Flag

Web videos
 Don't Hug Me I'm Scared
 Petscop

Multiple authors
 The Marvel Comics characters She-Hulk, Howard the Duck, Deadpool, Uatu the Watcher, Purple Man, Spider-Ham and Gwen Poole are all aware they are in a comic book.
 The DC Comics characters Ambush Bug and The Joker are aware that they are in a comic book.
 Penny Arcade frequently features metafiction, particularly their fantasy setting Epic Legends of the Hierarchs: The Elemenstor Saga, which has a detailed wiki devoted to it.
 The Ongoing Adventures of Rocket Llama is fiction with a metafictional history.
 Triangle and Robert is heavily metafictional.

Artists' books
 Space Opera: The Artist's Book by Michael J. Weller

References

Metafictional